Jean Siméon Domon (2 March 1774 in Leforest, Maurepas – 5 July 1830 In Paris), was a French cavalry officer during the French Revolutionary and Napoleonic Wars.

Notes

References

External links

1774 births
1830 deaths
French military personnel of the French Revolutionary Wars
Generals of the First French Empire
Names inscribed under the Arc de Triomphe
Barons of the First French Empire
Grand Officiers of the Légion d'honneur